Gerty, Oklahoma
Gerty Cori
Gerty Schlesinger
GERTY, robot from film the 2009 film Moon
Christopher E. Gerty (born 1975), NASA aerospace engineer
Gerty (video game) Indie PC game
Gerty (band) alt/indie band